Anthony J. Alexander is a business executive in the energy industry. He was born in 1951 in Akron, Ohio. He is affiliated with the Republican Party.

Current executive roles
Alexander was formerly the director, president and chief executive officer (from 2004 to 2015) of First Energy Corp. and FirstEnergy Service and CEO of FirstEnergy Nuclear Operating Company.  At the Pennsylvania Power Company, he is CEO and president.  Other places where holds the position of director include: the Ohio Edison Company, the Nuclear Energy Institute, the Cleveland Electric Illuminating Company, the Toledo Edison Company, Metropolitan Edison Company, Pennsylvania Electric Company, FirstEnergy Solutions Corp. and Team NEO. He is Director-at-large at the National Association of Manufacturers. He is CEO, president and manager of JCP&L Transition Funding LLC.

Board memberships
Alexander is a member of the board at: the Ohio Electric Utility Institute and the Association of Edison Illuminating Companies, Inc.  He is a member of the boards of trustees at: Akron General Health System, The NEOUCOM Foundation, Playhouse Square Foundation, the Green Schools Foundation and The University of Akron Foundation, and serves as vice chairman of the Greater Akron Chamber.

In 2013, his compensation was: $11,659,063. In 2012, he was listed as No. 275 for CEO compensation with Forbes.

Employment history
Alexander boasts four decades of experience in the energy industry through Ohio Edison Company and FirstEnergy Corp.  Leadership roles he has held at these firms include: executive vice president, general counsel and chief operating officer.  He was president and CEO of Metropolitan Edison Company.

Alexander's career began back in 1972, in Ohio Edison's tax department. From there he took on the role of attorney at the firm's legal department.  In 1984 he became a senior attorney there and three years later, he became associate general counsel.  Following on from that he held the roles of: VP and general counsel, senior VP and general counsel, executive VP and general counsel.  In 1997 he became executive VP and general counsel at FirstEnergy.

Education
Alexander has a Bachelor of Science Degree in accounting and a Juris Doctor from The University of Akron. He also did the Program for Management Development at the Harvard Graduate School of Business and the Reactor Technology Course for Utility Executives at the Massachusetts Institute of Technology.  In September 2019 a newly built wing to the University of Akron's College of Business building was named the Anthony J. Alexander professional development center.

References

Living people
FirstEnergy
American chief executives of energy companies
Businesspeople from Akron, Ohio
University of Akron alumni
Ohio Republicans
Year of birth missing (living people)